The Tour de Taiwan is an annual professional road bicycle racing stage race held in Taiwan since 1978, and has been part of the UCI Asia Tour since 2005. It has been classed a 2.1 category race for the first time in 2012.

History
The Tour de Taiwan was established by Giant Sports Foundation's founder, King Liu, in 1978. The first race began in Taipei, continued through Western Taiwan, Southern Taiwan, Eastern Taiwan, and finally ended in Taipei.

This cycling tour championship has been recognized by the International Cycling Union (UCI) in 2005, and was integrated with the Taipei Cycle Show, organized by the Taiwan External Trade Development Council, in 2006.

Past winners

See also
 List of sporting events in Taiwan

External links

 
 
 Statistics at the-sports.org
 Tour de Taiwan at cqranking.com
 

 
UCI Asia Tour races
Cycle races in Taiwan
Recurring sporting events established in 1978
1978 establishments in Taiwan
Spring (season) events in Taiwan
International cycle races hosted by Taiwan